Francisco Calvet i Puig (29 September 1921 – 30 November 2001) was a Spanish footballer who played for FC Barcelona between 1939 and 1952. He also played for Real Oviedo between 1952 and 1954.

Career
Calvet was born in 1921 and came from peasant family that lived in Sant Joan Despí. In 1939 Calvet left his home to play football for FC Barcelona. He played there until 1952 and appeared in 238 games and scored a total of 10 goals. In 1951-52, his last season at the club, he was part of the historic Barcelona team that won 5 trophies in one season. After his playing days in Barcelona were over he continued his career in Oviedo where he played between 1952 and 1954.

During his career Calvet also won two caps for the Spain national football team. He played his two international games in span of a week. His first match came on June 10, 1951 against Belgium and the second one on June 17, 1951 against Sweden.
He also appeared in 3 international games for Catalonia in 1950.

Calvet retired from football in 1954 at 33 years of age.

Honours
Spanish League: 1944-45, 1947–48, 1948–49, 1951–52
Spanish Cup: 1942, 1951, 1952
Latin Cup: 1949, 1952
Copa Eva Duarte: 1945, 1948.

References

External links
 

1921 births
2001 deaths
Spanish footballers
Association football forwards
La Liga players
FC Barcelona players
Real Oviedo players
Spain international footballers